"Someday Out of the Blue"  is a song recorded by Elton John for the soundtrack to the film The Road to El Dorado released in 2000, written by John, Patrick Leonard (music) and Tim Rice (lyrics). It serves as one of the themes of the said film and the first single of the soundtrack. The song tackles on remembering all the backstories that had been revealed to all of us, and spread when we get a little emotional on being a part of the culture. 

"Someday Out of the Blue" reached No. 5 on the Billboard Adult Contemporary chart and No. 49 on the Billboard Hot 100.
The song became John's most recent entry on the latter one in 21 years until it broke by the song "Cold Heart (Pnau remix)", which debuted at No. 81. It also reached No. 40 in Switzerland and No. 69 in Germany.

Music video
The music video includes some scenes of the movie and it features John performing this song (from the background of the film) in person to being an animated character on the film. It was directed by Joseph Kahn and Bibo Bergeron.

Live performances 
John performed this on various locations and concerts to promote the movie. However, he dropped it from his setlists later on and not played since 2000.

Charts

Personnel
Elton John – lead vocals, piano
Patrick Leonard – piano, keyboards and programming
Tim Pierce – electric guitar	
Heitor Pereira – nylon string guitar
Dean Parks – acoustic guitar
Curt Bisquera – drums	
Luis Conte – percussion
Richard Page, Siedah Garrett,  Lynn Davis, Kudisan Kai, Davey Johnstone, Phillip Ingram, Dorian Holley – background vocals		
Jeremy Lubbock – string arrangement

References 

2000 songs
Elton John songs
Songs written by Patrick Leonard
Songs about friendship
Songs with music by Elton John
Songs with lyrics by Tim Rice